Minakshi Mahanta is an Indian politician. She was elected to the Odisha Legislative Assembly from Champua as a member of the Biju Janata Dal.

References

Living people
Biju Janata Dal politicians
Women in Odisha politics
Odisha MLAs 2019–2024
Year of birth missing (living people)
21st-century Indian women politicians